The Datuk Wira Poh Ah Tiam Machap Recreational Park is a park in Machap Baru, Alor Gajah District, Melaka, Malaysia. The park commemorates the late politician Poh Ah Tiam.

History
The park was opened in 2007 and officiated by Prime Minister Najib Razak.

Architecture
The park was constructed with a cost of MYR1.2 million.

See also
 List of tourist attractions in Melaka

References

2007 establishments in Malaysia
Geography of Malacca
Parks in Malaysia